John Anthony Curry,  (9 September 1949 – 15 April 1994) was a British figure skater. He was the 1976 European, Olympic and World Champion. He was noted for combining ballet and modern dance influences into his skating.

Early life
Curry was born on 9 September 1949 in Birmingham, England. He had two older brothers. He was educated at Solihull School, a private school in the West Midlands and prior to this, at St Andrews, an independent boarding school in Somerset. As a child, Curry wanted to become a dancer, but his father disapproved of dance as an activity for boys. As a compromise, in 1957, he began to take figure skating lessons under the guidance of Ken Vickers at the Summerhill Road rink in Birmingham.

Skating career
After his father died from suicide when John was 16, he moved to London to study with Arnold Gerschwiler, who coached him to his first British title in 1971. In 1972 Curry found an American sponsor who enabled him to study in the United States with Gus Lussi and Carlo Fassi.

Competitive career
Fassi coached Curry to European, World, and Olympic titles in 1976. He also won the British championships that year, giving him the coveted Grand Slam in figure skating with his four major titles in 1976. In the same year he was the flag bearer at the Winter Olympics for Great Britain and was voted BBC Sports Personality of the Year in 1976. He was the first male figure skater from Great Britain to win Olympic gold.

As an amateur competitor, Curry was noted for his ballet-like posture and extension, and his superb body control. Along with Canadian skater Toller Cranston, Curry was responsible for bringing the artistic and presentation aspects of men's figure skating to a new level. At the peak of his competitive career, Curry was also accomplished both at compulsory figures and the athletic (jumping) aspects of free skating.

During his 1976 Olympic free skate he successfully landed a triple toe loop, a triple Salchow and a triple loop jump. His performance is known to have garnered the highest score ever given during the era of the 6.0 scoring in figure skating.  He earned 105.9 points out of a possible 108 points from a panel of 9 international judges.  Only the judges from Canada and the Soviet Union did not place him first.  The judges' decisions are noteworthy because the silver medallist was Vladimir Kovalev of USSR and the bronze medallist was Toller Cranston of Canada.

His skating was unusual in that his jumps were performed counter-clockwise but most of his spins (except flying spins) were performed clockwise. In his 1978 biography, Curry is clear that if he were to do it over, his choice would have been in favour of ballet due to its highly defined structure which was a basis for his ability to jump and spin in either direction thanks to his command of a true center line understanding.

Professional career
Following the 1976 World Championships, Curry turned professional and founded a touring skating company along the same lines as a traditional dance company.  Besides choreographing routines for the company, Curry commissioned works from such noted dance choreographers as Sir Kenneth MacMillan, Peter Martins and Twyla Tharp. Curry was reportedly a difficult person to get along with, and a dispute with the business managers of his company forced it to suspend operations in the mid-1980s. After that, Curry performed only rarely in public.

Curry's Broadway theatre credits include Icedancing (1978) as a performer and director and the 1980 revival of Brigadoon as an actor and the Roundabout Theatre 1989 revival of Privates on Parade as an actor.

Personal life
It is speculated that Curry was outed as gay by a German tabloid newspaper, Bild-Zeitung. before the March 1976 World Championships. In fact, he was competing in Gothenburg as Britain's (and the world's) first openly gay high profile sportsperson. The revelation had occurred in February 1976, when John Vinocur, a reporter from the Associated Press, interviewed him in the days prior 
to his Olympic victory. His report, which included quotes from Curry that were candid about his sexuality, was published 24 hours after the victory made headline news. Curry confirmed he was gay at a press conference in Innsbruck the same evening. It caused a brief scandal in Europe at the time, but Curry's sexual orientation was generally ignored by the press and public for many years afterwards.

In 1987 Curry was diagnosed with HIV, and in 1991 with AIDS. In October 1992 he gave an interview to a newspaper in which he spoke about both his disease and his sexual orientation. He spent the last years of his life with his mother. He died of an AIDS-related heart attack on 15 April 1994 in Binton, Warwickshire, aged 44. In line with his own wishes, Curry had a humanist funeral, led by celebrant Nigel Collins. A humanist memorial service took place later that year at Conway Hall Ethical Society, London.

Donald Spoto’s authorised biography of actor Alan Bates stated that Curry and Bates had a two-year affair and that Curry died in Bates's arms.

In 2018 a documentary on Curry's life and career, The Ice King, was released by Dogwoof Pictures.

Programmes

Results

See also
Larry Parnes

References

External links
On this day – 1976: John Curry skates to Olympic gold BBC News

1949 births
1994 deaths
AIDS-related deaths in England
BBC Sports Personality of the Year winners
British male single skaters
Figure skaters at the 1972 Winter Olympics
Figure skaters at the 1976 Winter Olympics
Gay sportsmen
English LGBT sportspeople
Olympic figure skaters of Great Britain
English Olympic medallists
Sportspeople from Birmingham, West Midlands
Olympic gold medallists for Great Britain
People educated at Solihull School
Olympic medalists in figure skating
LGBT figure skaters
World Figure Skating Championships medalists
European Figure Skating Championships medalists
Medalists at the 1976 Winter Olympics
Officers of the Order of the British Empire
20th-century English LGBT people